Saccara may refer to:

Saqqara (also spelled "Saccara"), an ancient Egyptian necropolis
Saccara (band), a German rock metal band

See also 
 Sakkara (disambiguation)